Viktor Dmitryevich Baranov (30 January 1928 – 14 August 2005) was a Soviet cross-country skier. He competed in the men's 50 kilometre event at the 1956 Winter Olympics.

References

1928 births
2005 deaths
Soviet male cross-country skiers
Olympic cross-country skiers of the Soviet Union
Cross-country skiers at the 1956 Winter Olympics
Place of birth missing